Sir Edward Nicholas Coventry Braddon  (11 June 1829 – 2 February 1904) was an Australian politician who served as Premier of Tasmania from 1894 to 1899, and was a Member of the First Australian Parliament in the House of Representatives. Braddon was a Tasmanian delegate to the Constitutional Conventions.

Both the suburb of Braddon in the Australian Capital Territory and the Division of Braddon in Tasmania are named after him.

Early life
Braddon was born in St. Kew, Cornwall in 1829, the son of unsuccessful solicitor Henry Braddon and his wife Fanny White. He had two sisters, one of whom, Mary Elizabeth Braddon, was later a famous novelist. Braddon was educated at various private schools including University College School, and later at University College London.

Henry and Fanny separated in 1840, due to Henry's financial failures, and in 1847, Braddon left for India to take a job with his cousin's merchant business. He later joined the Indian civil service, rising to the position of assistant commissioner, and serving as Inspector-General of Registration and Commissioner of Excise and Stamps.

Braddon married firstly Mary Georginia Palmer on the 24 Oct 1857 in Calcutta, India, she died aged 24 on the 28th of  July 1864 at Simla, Bengal. India. They had two sons and four daughters. One of these sons was Sir Henry Yule Braddon, who was a Rugby union player, representing New Zealand (the All Blacks) and New South Wales, and was later a Commissioner (ambassador) for Australia in the United States. Daughter Alice Gertrude married Colonel Bernard Underwood Nicolay CB (see Nicolay (family)).

In 1876, Braddon married Alice Smith, who survived him.

During the Indian Mutiny, Braddon fought as a volunteer on behalf of the British forces. In 1872, Braddon wrote a memoir detailing his experiences in India, entitled Life in India. He left the Indian civil service in 1878 and retired to Tasmania.

Political career

Tasmanian career
In 1879, Braddon was elected to the Tasmanian House of Assembly in the Division of West Devon, and he represented that constituency until November 1888. He became leader of the opposition in 1886 and after the defeat of the James Agnew government, he was asked to form a cabinet. However, he resigned the premiership to Philip Fysh, and instead became Minister for Lands and Works.

In 1888, Braddon represented Tasmania on the Federal Council, the predecessor to the Constitutional Conventions of the 1890s. After leaving parliament in 1888, Braddon was appointed Agent-General for Tasmania in London, a position he held until September 1893. While in London he helped to raise funds to float a number of ventures in Tasmania. These include the Mount Lyell Mining and Railway Company.

After returning to Tasmania, Braddon was again elected the member for West Devon, and again became opposition leader. In April 1894, Braddon became Premier, and held office until 12 October 1899, the longest term of any Premier up to that date. He drew no salary while in office, but a contemporary diarist, J.B. Walker, judged him "an adventurer ... not overburdened with conscience". 

In 1895, Braddon published another volume of memoirs, entitled Thirty Years of Shikar.

Federal career

Braddon was an important proponent of federation in Tasmania. He was elected as one of the Tasmanian representatives to the Constitutional Convention of 1897.

At the convention, he was responsible for the so-called "Braddon Clause" (or "Braddon Blot", as it was known by its opponents). The proposed Constitution provided that the Federal Government would assume the power to levy customs duties, an important source of revenue for the states. The Braddon Clause provided that the Commonwealth would have to return at least three-quarters of all duties collected.

After fierce debate, during which George Reid threatened to withdraw New South Wales from the convention, the Clause was limited in operation to ten years after Federation. The now-defunct Clause is still part of the Constitution of Australia as Section 87, however it was superseded by the Surplus Revenue Act 1910.

At the federal election of 1901, Braddon was elected to the first Australian Parliament as one of the five members for Tasmania, which had not yet been divided into electoral divisions. He was not only the oldest member of the House of Representatives, but, at almost 72 years of age, he is still the oldest person ever elected to the House of Representatives. (The city of Melbourne, where the Parliament then met, had not been founded at the time of his birth). As a supporter of free trade, he joined with Sir George Reid and became a member of the Free Trade Party, where he would occasionally stand as Leader of the Opposition when Reid was absent. In the debates over the Commonwealth Franchise Act 1902 he spoke in favour of the disenfranchisement of Aboriginals. Braddon was re-elected at the federal election of 1903, as the first member for the Division of Wilmot, but he died suddenly at his home in Tasmania in 1904 before the parliament returned from recess.

Braddon is buried at Pioneer Cemetery in Forth, Tasmania. In February 2004, his grave was restored and a lookout constructed nearby to commemorate the centenary of his death.

Honours
In 1891 Braddon was made a Knight Commander of the Order of St Michael and St George. In 1897 he was made a member of the Privy Council.

The Canberra suburb of Braddon, Australian Capital Territory was named after him in 1928.

See also

 Members of the Australian House of Representatives, 1901-1903
 Members of the Australian House of Representatives, 1903-1906

References

 Tasmanian Bicentenary Office – 200 Footprints

External links 
 Thirty years of Shikar (1895)

Further reading
 

|-

1829 births
1904 deaths
Premiers of Tasmania
Free Trade Party members of the Parliament of Australia
British people in colonial India
Australian people of Cornish descent
British emigrants to Australia
Members of the Australian House of Representatives for Wilmot
Members of the Australian House of Representatives for Tasmania
Members of the Australian House of Representatives
Australian Knights Commander of the Order of St Michael and St George
Australian members of the Privy Council of the United Kingdom
Members of the Tasmanian House of Assembly
People educated at University College School
Leaders of the Opposition in Tasmania
Treasurers of Tasmania
19th-century Australian politicians
20th-century Australian politicians
Burials in Tasmania